Jang Da-hye  (born  August 9, 1991), better known by her stage name Heize, is a South Korean singer, rapper, songwriter, composer and producer currently signed to P Nation. The name Heize was inspired by the name of an American rapper Angel Haze, but instead of using the same English spelling, she decided to use Heize instead of Haze, because that was the spelling that came to mind. After making her debut in 2014 with the EP Heize, she gained attention after appearing on the second season of South Korean reality show Unpretty Rapstar. Shortly after, her breakout hit “Star” reached the top of the music charts.

Career

2014–present: Solo debut, first and second full-length album
Heize made her debut in 2014 with her EP Heize, which included a total of six songs. Heize took part in Mnet's reality rap show Unpretty Rapstar but was eliminated in the semi-finals. Nevertheless, her appearance brought her attention as a singer.

Heize released her second EP And July in 2016, and it eventually peaked at 34 at the Gaon Music Chart. The two singles "And July" and "Shut Up & Groove" peaked at 8 and 27, respectively, on the Korean national chart. "Shut Up & Groove" also charted on Billboard US World chart.

Heize released her digital single "Star" in December 2016, and it achieved an "All-Kill" after reaching number one in all Korean music real-time charts upon release. Her third extended play, /// (You, Clouds, Rain) (2017) and its lead singles "Don't Know You" and "You, Clouds, Rain" were successful and achieved "All-Kill" after reaching number one in all Korean music real-time charts and charted at number one on Gaon Digital ChartHeize released her fourth EP, Wind (alternatively called Wish & Wind), on March 8, 2018. It was well received, with the lead singles topping the charts. 

Heize released her first studio album, She's Fine, on March 19, 2019. The album contains 11 songs and features appearances from Simon Dominic, Colde, Sunwoo Jung-a, Jooyoung, Nafla and DAVII. She reportedly chose the title of the album because she "wanted to tell people that it's all fine." Billboard ranked the album as number 11 on its list of the "25 Best K-pop Albums of 2019", commenting, "Satin-soft sensitivity wraps the album in warm comfort, drawing one into Heize's heart and proving why she is one of the most colorful and exciting artists of her generation."

On July 7, 2019, Heize released the single "We Don't Talk Together" featuring Korean rapper Giriboy. Produced by Suga, the alt R&B song is co-written by Heize and is about how a former couple has grown far apart from one another." The song reached number two on the South Korean Gaon Digital Chart.

On September 16, 2020, it was announced that Heize signed with P Nation, an entertainment company founded by Psy. On May 20, 2021, Heize released her seventh EP, Happen, her first release under P Nation. On March 29, 2022, Heize released the digital single, "Mother". On June 30, 2022, Heize released her second studio album, Undo. In August 2022, Heize will join the radio show Heize's Volume Up, which will air for the first time on August 22, joining after the actress, Shin Ye-eun who withdrew.

Discography

Studio albums
 She's Fine (2019)
 Undo (2022)

Filmography

Television shows

Radio shows

Tours and concerts 
 Heize 1st Concert 'Heize City (2022)

Awards and nominations

References

External links

 Website

1991 births
Living people
South Korean women pop singers
South Korean women singer-songwriters
MAMA Award winners
Golden Disc Award winners
Melon Music Award winners
Unpretty Rapstar contestants
21st-century South Korean women singers
People from Daegu